Eklanda is a suburban neighbourhood with 3000 inhabitants in Mölndal Municipality, part of the Gothenburg urban area. Eklanda is predominantly made up of high- and medium-income households. 

Eklanda is adjacent to the Högsbo 421 shopping mall and Änggårdsbergen protected area. 

Metropolitan Gothenburg